Aphaenops hidalgoi is a species of beetle in the subfamily Trechinae. It was described by Espanol & Camas in 1985.

References

hidalgoi
Beetles described in 1985